The Biological Society of Pakistan is an organization in Pakistan which is engaged in the promotion of learning and research of biology in the region. The Biological Society of Pakistan has been acknowledged at global scale in terms of contribution in classical as well as in emerging modern technological aspects of the biological sciences. Its members mainly consist of those interested in the biological sciences.

Introduction

The Biological Society of Pakistan was founded in 1949 under the auspices of the Pakistan Association for the Advancement of Science by a group of biologists mainly stationed at Lahore, Pakistan at the zoology and botany departments of Government College, Lahore, and as well as those at Punjab University, Lahore. The botany and zoology departments of Punjab University and of Government College, Lahore were housed at that time in one building that belonged to Government College, Lahore and were known as Biological Laboratories, Government College, Lahore, Pakistan.

Objectives

The society was started with a charter having the following objectives:
 The society shall be called Biological Society of Pakistan.
 The headquarters of the society shall be located in Biological Laboratories of Government College, Lahore, Pakistan.
 The object of the society shall be promotion of the cause of biological sciences in Pakistan.

The society shall try to realize these objectives by:
 The publication of the journal to be called Pakistan Journal of Biology.
 Holding meetings, seminars and congresses to discuss biological problems.
 Creating facilities for original research in biological sciences.

This society with the above charter was registered under Societies Act XXI of 1860 of the Punjab on 10 April 1955. A total of 142 scientists from all over Pakistan were enrolled initially.

Management

Mian Afzal Hussain was elected as the first president with Dr. Nazir Ahmad as secretary and Mr. Sher Ahmad Lodhi as its treasurer. This society was mainly concerned with the promotion of learning and research in biology. However, in 1955, the scientists and teachers working in the botany and zoology department at Government College, Lahore and that of Punjab University decided to rename the society the Biological Society of Pakistan and to publish a regular research journal. 
Dr. Ahsan-ul-Islam was assigned the job of framing the bylaws of the society and Dr. M. Saleem was assigned the task of enrolling the members of the society. Dr. Sultan Ahmad with Dr. Muzaffar Ahmad took over the responsibilities of looking after the publication of the journal.

References

External links
 Biological Society of Pakistan
 Government College University, Lahore

Biology societies
Science and technology in Pakistan
Organizations established in 1949
1949 establishments in Pakistan